Collège catholique Franco-Ouest is a French Catholic high school in the Nepean district of Ottawa, Ontario, Canada. It is known for welcoming many people from the diversified cultures of Ottawa. It is located on 411 Seyton Drive in Bells Corners. It is an accredited school of the IB offering their middle and diploma programs.

History
The school first opened to grade 8 and grade 9 students in September 1991 at 148 Meadowlands Dr West, in what was then the city of Nepean. It officially received the name of "Collège catholique Franco-Ouest" in December of that year. In 1992, the school received its students at the Sir John A. Macdonald building, on 2675 Draper avenue and taught grade 8 through 10 students. In 1994, teaching encompasses grades 11 and 12, and starting in 2001, 7th graders are admitted.

In 1999, the school announced that it'll move to its current location of 411 Seyton Dr, basically swapping with St. Paul's High School that was located there at the time.

Student government
Franco-Ouest has a Student Government made up of a Prime Minister, Deputy Prime Minister, Secretary, Treasurer, Minister of Culture, and Minister of Sports. The Student Assembly, which is in turn composed of class representatives for each homeroom is usually scheduled to meet the Student Government once a month in order to discuss upcoming events as well as the issues currently facing students.

Role, duties and jurisdiction of the Student Government
The Student Government has a large array of duties and responsibilities. Among those duties are setting up the annual club and committee sign-up, elections for the class representatives, elections for the Student Government as well as organizing activities for students. The Student Government has jurisdiction over all clubs and committees and can act as a representative for the various sport teams at the school. Also, there is usually one member among the Student Government that sits on the School Council along with the parents and the principal. Also, the Student Government has sole jurisdiction over the school's dances as well as the Student Assembly.

Student Government influence on school policy 
Student Government does not have a binding say on school policy but does share its opinion with the faculty and the administration over any new or changing rules within the school. Sitting on the School Council also gives it an opportunity to share its thoughts with the parents as well as the principal in an open forum. More often than not, a member of the Student Government (usually the Prime Minister) is asked to mediate a situation and present a solution to an issue facing students as was the case with the amended rule regarding the length of shorts back in 2009 and an alternative for the end-of-the-year grade twelve prank, which was circumvented by putting in place a grad night at the school.

Expansion
Between 2005 and 2006, the school went under extensive renovations worth ten million dollars. These renovations have resulted in a new gym, an atrium, a chapel (later temporarily converted to a music room) and several new classrooms.

Charity
Marche Buchanan: Every year in may, College Catholique Franco-Ouest organizes a community fund raiser to collect money for the Marche Buchanan foundation in memory of Robert Buchanan, a late Franco-Ouest teacher who had passed in 2005 after his battle against cancer. Since this project has started, there have been over $100 000 worth of donations that have been collected for this foundation.

Beef

In 2022 and going into 2023, there was beef concerning 2 students and 3 birds.

See also
List of high schools in Ontario

References

External links

School Website
Board Website

High schools in Ottawa
French-language high schools in Ontario
International Baccalaureate schools in Ontario
Catholic secondary schools in Ontario
Educational institutions established in 1991
1991 establishments in Ontario
Middle schools in Ottawa